The 1937 Belmont Stakes was the 69th running of the Belmont Stakes. It was the 31st Belmont Stakes held at Belmont Park in Elmont, New York and was held on June 5, 1937. With a field of seven horses, War Admiral, the winner of that year's Kentucky Derby and Preakness Stakes won the 1 –mile race (12 f; 2.4 km) by 3 lengths over Sceneshifter.

With the win, War Admiral became the fourth Triple Crown champion.

Results

 Winning breeder: Samuel D. Riddle; (KY)

External links 
BelmontStakes.com

References

Belmont Stakes races
Belmont Stakes
Belmont Stakes
Belmont Stakes